Wah Fu North, formerly called Wah Fu II is one of the 17 constituencies in the Southern District, Hong Kong.

The constituency returns one district councillor to the Southern District Council, with an election every four years. The seat was last held by Yim Chun-ho of the Democratic Party.

The Wah Fu North constituency is loosely based on northeastern part of the Wah Fu Estate in Pokfulam with estimated population of 14,386.

Councillors represented

Election results

2010s

2000s

1990s

Notes

Citations

References
2011 District Council Election Results (Southern)
2007 District Council Election Results (Southern)
2003 District Council Election Results (Southern)
1999 District Council Election Results (Southern)
 

Constituencies of Hong Kong
Constituencies of Southern District Council
1994 establishments in Hong Kong
Constituencies established in 1994
Pok Fu Lam